Longridge High School is a coeducational secondary school located in Longridge in the English county of Lancashire.

It is a community school administered by Lancashire County Council. The school also has a specialism in mathematics and computing. Longridge High School offers GCSEs, BTECs and OCR Nationals as programmes of study for pupils.

References

External links
Longridge High School official website

Secondary schools in Lancashire
Schools in Ribble Valley
Community schools in Lancashire
Longridge